The Irish University Bill (Bill 55 of session 36 Victoria; long title A Bill for the Extension of University Education in Ireland; proposed short title the University Act (Ireland), 1873) was a bill introduced in the Parliament of the United Kingdom in 1873 by the first Gladstone government to expand the University of Dublin into a secular national university incorporating multiple colleges.

Proposal
In 1873, as now, Dublin University comprised a single college, Trinity College, which was founded in 1592. Admission  had been restricted to members of the established Anglican Church of Ireland till the Catholic Relief Act 1793. The Irish Church Act 1869 disestablished the church, but scholars, fellows and professors of the college were still required to be Anglicans.

The secular Queen's University of Ireland had been founded in 1845–50 with colleges in Belfast, Cork, and Galway. Lacking government recognition were the Catholic University of Ireland founded in Dublin in 1851 and the Presbyterian Magee College founded in Derry in 1865. The 1873 bill proposed to abolish the failing Galway college and make all the others colleges of an expanded Dublin University. All religious requirements for students and faculty in all colleges would be abolished. Trinity College's Theology faculty would be detached and removed to the control of the Church of Ireland.

Opposition
The proposal was strongly opposed by the Roman Catholic Church in Ireland, and partly opposed by the Presbyterians and the existing Trinity College faculty. It was defeated by three votes on its second reading in the House of Commons on 11 March 1873. This was one factor in the eventual fall of the government in 1874.

Later
The abolition of the Anglican test oath for Dublin University and Trinity College, except in the School of Divinity, was effected by the University of Dublin Tests Act, 1873 (An Act to abolish Tests in Trinity College and the University of Dublin; 36 & 37 Victoria, c. 22) introduced by Henry Fawcett and hence called "Fawcett's Act".  Until 1970, the Irish Catholic hierarchy discouraged Catholics from attending the university. Under the Disraeli administration, the University Education (Ireland) Act 1879 altered the Queen's University of Ireland into the Royal University of Ireland and facilitated access to it for the Catholic and Presbyterian colleges. Trinity College and Dublin University were not affected.

References

Primary
 From EPPI:
 Bill for Extension of University Education in Ireland
 Irish University Bill: resolutions of the standing committee (on Trinity College) of the General Assembly of the Irish Presbyterian Church
 Declaration of Catholic Union to First Lord of Treasury, January 1873; Resolutions of Roman Catholic Archbishops and Bishops, on University Education in Ireland
 Certain matters relating to the College of the Holy and Undivided Trinity of Queen Elizabeth, near Dublin: report, minutes of evidence and appendix p.110
 Hansard 1873, Commons debates Vol.214:
 13 Feb cc377-429 First reading
 18 Feb cc599-600 Question
 24 Feb cc832-33 Question
 27 Feb cc1038-39 Question
 3 Mar cc1181-82 Notice of motion
 3 Mar cc1186-277 Second reading begins
 6 Mar cc1389-90 Referral to select committee
 6 Mar c1396
 6 Mar cc1398-1513 Second reading resumes
 10 Mar cc1615-17
 10 Mar cc1617-1713
 11 Mar cc1739-40
 11 Mar cc1741-1868 Second reading ends, Vote

Secondary

Notes

External links
 Irish University Bill 1873, full PDF from EPPI (Enhanced British Parliamentary Papers on Ireland)

Proposed laws of Ireland
Universities and colleges in Ireland
University of Dublin
1873 in Ireland
1873 in British law